Artitropa usambarae is a species of butterfly in the family Hesperiidae. It is found in north-eastern Tanzania. The habitat consists of forests.

The larvae feed on Dracaena species.

References

Endemic fauna of Tanzania
Butterflies described in 1998
Hesperiinae